Wilhelm Reinhold Moberg (19 November 1898 – 23 December 1977) was a Swedish Olympic sailor. In the 1936 Summer Olympics, he sailed with the 8-metre Ilderim, helmed by Tore Holm, and finished 4th.

References

Swedish male sailors (sport)
Olympic sailors of Sweden
8 Metre class sailors
Sailors at the 1936 Summer Olympics – 8 Metre
1898 births
1977 deaths
20th-century Swedish people